Cliff Pennington may refer to:

 Cliff Pennington (ice hockey) (1940–2020), Canadian ice hockey forward 
 Cliff Pennington (baseball) (born 1984), Major League Baseball infielder